Park Kun (パク・ゴン) is a South Korean football player. He currently plays for Pohang Steelers.

Club statistics
Updated to 23 February 2017.

References

External links

Profile at Thespakusatsu Gunma
 

Living people
1990 births
South Korean footballers
J2 League players
J3 League players
K League 2 players
Avispa Fukuoka players
AC Nagano Parceiro players
Thespakusatsu Gunma players
Bucheon FC 1995 players
Association football defenders
People from Gunsan
Sportspeople from North Jeolla Province